Michael Schorr is a video game designer and the former drummer of Death Cab for Cutie with whom he recorded The Photo Album and two of their EPs The Forbidden Love E.P. and The Stability E.P.. He has also played for The Long Winters. Speaking of Schorr in 2003, Benjamin Gibbard noted that Death Cab for Cutie "parted ways with our last drummer [Michael Schorr] because… let’s just call them creative differences. It was nothing sinister, evil or violent."

Schorr is currently working in the video game industry at 343 industries as Forge Lead Designer for Halo Infinite, and is currently the drummer for the post-punk band Fotoform.

References

Alternative rock drummers
American alternative rock musicians
American indie rock musicians
American rock drummers
Death Cab for Cutie members
Living people
The Long Winters members
Year of birth missing (living people)

Video game developers